Benetti is a surname of Italian origin. It may refer to:

 Benetti, an Italian shipbuilding and Boat building company based in Viareggio, Livorno, and Fano, owned by Azimut

People 
 Adriana Benetti (1919–2016), Italian actress
 Andrea Benetti (born 1980), Italian slalom canoeist
 Carlo Benetti (1885–1949), Italian film actor of the silent era
 César Benetti (born 1924), Argentine swimmer 
 Claudio Edgar Benetti (born 1971), Argentine former footballer
 Edo Benetti (born 1941), Australian former football player
 Jason Benetti (born 1983), American sportscaster
 John Benetti (1937–2013), Australian rules footballer 
 Manuel Benetti (born 1981), Italian former professional football defender
 Ramiro Moschen Benetti (born 1993), Brazilian professional footballer
 Romeo Benetti (born 1945), Italian former football defensive midfielder

See also 
 Benett

Italian-language surnames
Patronymic surnames
Surnames from given names